Tide of Empire  is a 1929 American silent Western film directed by Allan Dwan and starring Renée Adorée and Tom Keene. The film was originally slated to star Joan Crawford in the female lead, but the final filming had Renée Adorée instead of Crawford. It was one of the last MGM silents and performed badly at the box office.

On January 12, 2010, Tide of Empire was released on home video for the first time on DVD on Warner Archive Collection.

Buster Keaton, who was visiting the set, got cast in a cameo as a drunk getting thrown out of a saloon.

Cast
 Renée Adorée as Josephita Guerrero
 Tom Keene as Dermond D'Arcy (credited as George Duryea)
 Fred Kohler as Cannon
 George Fawcett as Don Jose
 William Collier Jr. as Romaldo
 James Bradbury Sr. as Jabez
 Harry Gribbon as O'Shea
 Paul Hurst as Poppy
 Rosita Delmar (uncredited)
 Richard Alexander as Gold Miner with Whip (uncredited)
 Irving Bacon as Townsman (uncredited)
 Fred Burns as Vigilante (uncredited)
 Bob Card as Fiddle Player (uncredited)
 Jim Corey as Raider (uncredited)
 Gino Corrado as Carlos Montalvo (uncredited)
 Pat Harmon as Raider (uncredited)
 Buster Keaton as Drunk Cowboy Thrown Out of Saloon (uncredited)
 Augustina López as Guerreros Servant (uncredited)
 Eric Mayne as Don Emilio (uncredited)
 Charles Stevens as Indian Servant (uncredited)

References

External links

 
 Tide of Empire at tcm.com
 Stills at silenthollywood.com
 Still at gettyimages.com

1929 films
1929 Western (genre) films
American black-and-white films
Films directed by Allan Dwan
Metro-Goldwyn-Mayer films
Silent American Western (genre) films
1920s American films
1920s English-language films